Dong Mada is a village and tambon (subdistrict) of Mae Lao District, in Chiang Rai Province, Thailand. In 2005, it had a population of 9,642. The tambon contains 18 villages.

References

Tambon of Chiang Rai province
Populated places in Chiang Rai province